Social Development is a quarterly peer-reviewed online-only scientific journal covering developmental psychology, with a specific focus on children's behavioral development. It was established in 1992 by Rudolf Schaffer and is published by John Wiley & Sons. 

The current editors-in-chief are Elizabeth A. Lemerise (Western Kentucky University), Amy Halberstadt (North Carolina State University), and Luna Centifanti (University of Liverpool). According to the Journal Citation Reports, the journal has a 2017 impact factor of 2.042, ranking it 31st out of 73 journals in the category "Psychology, Developmental".

References

External links

Developmental psychology journals
Wiley-Blackwell academic journals
Publications established in 1992
Quarterly journals
English-language journals